Manta District is one of nineteen districts of the province Huancavelica in Peru.

Geography 
Other mountains are listed below:

References